Sosnitsy is a rural locality (a village) in Borisoglebskoye Rural Settlement, Muromsky District, Vladimir Oblast, Russia. The population was 7 as of 2010. There are 3 streets.

Geography 
Sosnitsy is located 49 km northeast of Murom (the district's administrative centre) by road. Shumilikha is the nearest rural locality.

References 

Rural localities in Muromsky District